HM Prison Barlinnie is the largest prison in Scotland. It is operated by the Scottish Prison Service and is located in the residential suburb of Riddrie, in the north east of Glasgow, Scotland. It is informally known locally as The Big Hoose, Bar and Bar-L. In 2018, plans for its closure were announced.

History

Barlinnie was designed by Major General Thomas Bernard Collinson, architect and engineer to the Scottish Prison Department, and it was built in the then rural area of Riddrie adjacent to the Monkland Canal (now the route of the M8 motorway), first opening with the commissioning of A hall in July 1882.

Barlinnie prison's five accommodation halls: A, B, C, D and E, were built in stages between 1882 and 1897, with each holding approximately 69 inmates.

There was a major extension to the perimeter in 1967 to create an industrial compound. From 1973 till 1994, the world-famous "Special Unit" placed emphasis on rehabilitation, the best known success story being that of reformed Glasgow gangster Jimmy Boyle. Cultural output associated with the Special Unit included Boyle's autobiography, A Sense of Freedom (1977); The Hardman (1977), the play Boyle wrote with Tom McGrath; a body of sculpture; and The Silent Scream (1979), a book of prose and poems by Larry Winters, who committed suicide in 1977.

Capital punishment
A total of 10 judicial executions by hanging took place at HMP Barlinnie between 1947 and 1960, replacing the gallows at Duke Street Prison before the final abolition of capital punishment in the United Kingdom for murder in 1969:

Each of the condemned men had been convicted of murder. All the executions took place at 8.00 am. As was the custom, the remains of all executed prisoners were the property of the state, and were therefore buried in unmarked graves within the walls of the prison. During the D hall renovations of 1997, the prison gallows cell (built into D-hall) was finally demolished and the remains of all the executed prisoners were exhumed for reburial elsewhere. The first man to escape from Barlinnie was John Dobbie, three days after being sentenced to 15 years for a violent robbery in 1985. Dobbie escaped inside a laundry van, he was captured by armed police five days later and was sentenced to a further five years.

Current use
Today Barlinnie is the largest prison in Scotland, holding well over 1,000 prisoners although it has a design capacity of 987. The prison currently receives prisoners from the courts in the West of Scotland as well as retaining male remand prisoners and prisoners serving less than 4-year sentences. It also allocates suitable prisoners from its convicted population to lower security prisons, including HMP Low Moss and HMP Greenock, as well as holding long-term prisoners in the initial phase of their sentence prior to transfer to long-term prisons such as HMP Glenochil, HMP Shotts, HMP Kilmarnock or HMP Grampian.

Barlinnie prison still consists of five accommodation halls with each holding approximately 200 inmates and an additional National Top End Facility (Letham Hall) housing long term prisoners nearing the end of their incarceration. All five accommodation halls were refurbished between 1997 and 2004. There is also a hospital unit with accommodation for 18 prisoners, which includes eight cells specially designed for suicide supervision. A new administration and visiting block was completed in 1999.

The in-cell bucket-as-toilet routine known as slopping out was still in practice there as late as 2003. Since 2001, refurbishment has taken place after critical reports by the Scottish Chief Inspector of Prisons.

In October 2018, it was announced that HMP Barlinnie is to be sold and replaced with a new superjail within Glasgow or its outskirts.

In 2019, local MP Paul Sweeney proposed that the historic prison buildings be saved from demolition and converted into a prison museum after it is decommissioned.

In January 2020, the Prison Service announced that the proposed site for the replacement prison was a  site adjacent to the nearby Provan Gas Works.

Notable former inmates
 Paul Ferris – Glasgow Gangland figure
 Jimmy Boyle
Hugh Collins – died 14 August 2021 aged 70. Glasgow Gangland figure, once dubbed Scotland's most dangerous prisoner, author and sculptor, married Caroline McNairn 
 Duncan Ferguson
 Peter Manuel
 Abdelbaset al-Megrahi – Lockerbie bomber (died of cancer in 2012)
 Tommy Sheridan – Scottish politician

Further reading
 Carrell, Christopher & Laing, Joyce (eds.) (1982), The Special Unit Barlinnie Prison: Its Evolution through its Art, Third Eye Centre, Glasgow, 
 Ross, Anthony (1979), review of The Silent Scream by Larry Winters, in Cencrastus No. 1, Autumn 1979, pp. 7 & 8, 
 Ross, Anthony (1983), review of The Special Unit Barlinnie Prison: It's Evolution through its Art, in Hearn, Sheila G. (ed.), Cencrastus No. 11, New Year 1983, p. 48,

References

External links

HMP Barlinnie on the SPS website
'Hanging With Frank' (video showing UK execution protocol at the old gallows in Barlinnie Prison)

Government buildings in Glasgow
Barlinnie
1882 establishments in Scotland
Barlinnie
Government agencies established in 1882